Sofulu may refer to:
Sofulu, Agdam, Azerbaijan
Sofulu, Jabrayil, Azerbaijan
Sofulu, Qazakh, an enclave-village of Azerbaijan, occupied by Armenia since 1992
Soufli, a city in Greece, whose Turkish name is Sofulu